Tiffany Lincoln (born 7 April 1985) is an Australian netball player. In 2008, Lincoln played for the New South Wales Swifts in the ANZ Championship. She was not signed to play in the 2009 season.

References
2008 New South Wales Swifts profile. Retrieved on 2008-07-18.

1985 births
Living people
Australian netball players
New South Wales Swifts players
Netball New South Wales Waratahs players
Australian Netball League players
Hunter Jaegers players
New South Wales Institute of Sport netball players
New South Wales state netball league players